Sir John Stokell Dodds  (1848 – 23 June 1914) was an Australian politician and Chief Justice of Tasmania.

Early life

Dodds was born in Durham, England, the son of William and Annie ( Shute) Dodds. The family moved to Hobart, Tasmania, arriving in 1853. His father died soon afterwards and Dodds was educated in Hobart. At 16 years old he began to study law, was admitted to the bar in 1872, and in a few years had a large practice. He took an active part in sport and was a good oarsman and cricketer.

Career

In 1878 Dodds was asked to stand for parliament, was elected to the Tasmanian House of Assembly for East Hobart, and was given a seat in the William L. Crowther ministry as attorney-general in December 1878. When W. R. Giblin formed his coalition ministry in October 1879 Dodds held the same position until December 1881, when he exchanged it for that of colonial treasurer.

Giblin retired from politics in August 1884 and Dodds became attorney-general under Adye Douglas until March 1886, when Douglas went to London as Agent-general. Douglas recommended that Sir James W. Agnew should be asked to form a ministry, but he could not do so because Dodds, who was the leader of the assembly, felt that he should have been sent for. Dodds then succeeded in forming a ministry, and having established the principle, stood aside and Agnew became premier. It was, however, felt by many that Dodds, who took the portfolio of attorney-general, was the real leader of the government. In 1887 he was appointed one of the representatives of Tasmania at the colonial conference held at London, and while on the voyage was offered and accepted the position of puisne judge of the supreme court. He held this position for 12 years and in 1898 was appointed chief justice. Five years later he became lieutenant-governor and administered the government on several occasions.

He was appointed a CMG in 1889, was knighted 22 January 1900, and created a Knight Commander of the Order of St Michael and St George (KCMG) 15 May 1901, in preparation of the forthcoming royal visit of the Duke and Duchess of Cornwall and York (later King George V and Queen Mary).

Legacy

Dodds died in his home on 23 June 1914. His wife, Emma Augusta (1835-1910), daughter of the Rev. James Norman, had predeceased him. He was survived by two sons.

Dodds was in office for practically the whole of his nine years in parliament and did some excellent work, succeeding in obtaining reductions in mail subsidies, and reducing the rates for postages and telegrams. Dodds was also responsible for the establishment of post office savings banks. He was regarded as a very capable judge. 

As chief justice and lieutenant-governor his duties were always admirably discharged, and as chancellor of the University of Tasmania, president of the Art and other societies, he did much to foster the cultural life of Hobart.

References

Sources
G. H. Crawford, 'Dodds, Sir John Stokell (1848 - 1914)', Australian Dictionary of Biography, Volume 4, MUP, 1972, pp 80–81.

 

1848 births
1914 deaths
Chief Justices of Tasmania
Judges of the Supreme Court of Tasmania
19th-century Australian judges
20th-century Australian judges
Australian barristers
Attorneys-General of Tasmania
Members of the Tasmanian House of Assembly
Australian Knights Bachelor
Australian Knights Commander of the Order of St Michael and St George
Australian politicians awarded knighthoods
English emigrants to Australia
Colony of Tasmania judges